Kenneth Stanton Calvert (born June 8, 1953) is an American businessman and politician serving as the U.S. representative for , and previously the 44th, 42nd, and 43rd, serving since 1993. He is a member of the Republican Party. The district is part of the Inland Empire of Southern California.

Early life, education, and business career
Calvert was born in Corona, California, to Marceline Hamblen and Ira D. Calvert Jr., and still lives in Corona. In 1970, shortly after high school, he joined the congressional campaign of former state Assemblyman Victor Veysey. Calvert worked in Veysey's Washington, D.C., office as an intern after a 1972 victory. He graduated from Corona High School in 1971.

Calvert received an Associate of Arts degree from Chaffey Community College in 1973 and a Bachelor of Arts degree from San Diego State University in 1975. After graduation, he managed his family's restaurant in Corona, the Jolly Fox, for five years. He then entered the real estate industry and ran Ken Calvert Real Properties until he was elected to Congress.

U.S. House of Representatives

Elections
In 1982, the 29-year-old Calvert ran for the United States House of Representatives to represent a newly drawn district. He narrowly lost the Republican primary to Riverside County Supervisor Al McCandless, who was the choice of the Republican establishment. McCandless won the general election. From 1984 to 1988, Calvert chaired the Riverside County Republican Party.

Calvert was first elected to the House in a new district in 1992, while McCandless was reelected in a different district. Calvert won the general election with 47% of the vote, defeating Democrat Mark Takano by 519 votes. In 1994, he defeated Joe Khoury in the Republican primary, 51% to 49%. He was reelected in the 1994 general election with 55% of the vote, again defeating Takano.

In 1996, Calvert was reelected with 54% of the vote, defeating Democrat Guy Kimbrough. In 1998 he defeated Democrat Mike Rayburn with 55% of the vote. Calvert won again in 2000 with 74% of the vote, facing no major-party opposition.

Calvert was reelected in 2002, defeating college administrator Louis Vandenberg with 64% of the vote. He defeated Vandenberg again in 2004 with 61% of the vote, and in 2006 with 60% of the vote.

In 2008, Calvert had a surprisingly close race, defeating Democratic nominee Bill Hedrick with 52% of the vote. He declared victory immediately, but Hedrick waited three weeks before conceding, due to unusually high turnout prolonging the vote-counting process.

In 2010, Hedrick ran against Calvert again. While most pundits, such as Larry Sabato, expected him to lose again, sources such as The New York Times ranked the race more competitive. The New York Times re-ranked this race from solid Republican to leaning Republican. Calvert won by ten percentage points.

The National Journals Cook Political Report named Calvert one of the top 10 Republicans most vulnerable to redistricting in 2012, largely due to his district's rapidly growing Hispanic population. Despite this, Calvert defeated opponent Michael Williamson with 61% of the vote.

In 2022, Calvert sought reelection in California's 41st congressional district due to redistricting. He defeated Democrat Will Rollins in the November 2022 general election.

Tenure
111th and 112th Congress
On June 10, 2009, Calvert introduced H.R. 2788, the Distinguished Flying Cross National Memorial Act. This Act designates a national memorial at March Field Air Museum in honor of current and former members of the armed forces who have been awarded the Distinguished Flying Cross. Calvert worked to assemble a bipartisan group of 48 cosponsors for this legislation. On March 19, 2010, H.R. 2788 unanimously passed the House of Representatives. Calvert introduced H. Res. 377, a bill recognizing Armed Forces Day and the service of the members of the United States Armed Forces on April 29, 2009. This bill received 70 bipartisan cosponsorships and passed the House unanimously on May 14, 2009.

On March 25, 2010, Calvert introduced H. Res. 1219 to support the designation of a National Child Awareness Month to promote awareness of children's charities and youth-serving organizations across the country. He assembled 40 bipartisan cosponsors for this bill and on July 19, 2010, the bill passed the House with unanimous support.

Calvert is a member of the Republican Main Street Partnership.

In December 2017, Calvert voted in favor of the Tax Cuts and Jobs Act, calling it "the most pro-growth tax policy our country has seen in decades." He also said that it would provide "lower taxes, more jobs, and higher wages."

In December 2020, Calvert signed onto the lawsuit seeking to overturn the 2020 presidential election. The Supreme Court refused to hear the case on December 11. In January 2021, Calvert voted with six other California representatives to reject the certification of Arizona's and Pennsylvania's electoral votes. He questioned the results of the election, saying: "during difficult and divisive times in our nation I believe we must follow the Constitution. That's why today I lent my voice to the millions of Americans and my constituents who are deeply concerned by the integrity of the election ... I remain especially troubled by constitutionally questionable changes of voting rules in some states by authorities other than state legislatures."

E-Verify
Calvert is the original author of the E-Verify law, the only employment verification program available to employers to check the work authorization status of newly hired employees. In 1995, he introduced H.R. 502, which was later included in the immigration reform bill, H.R. 2202. The immigration reforms were later wrapped into the FY1997 Omnibus Appropriations Act. The original program, known as the Basic Pilot Program, was only available to five states and employers used a call-in system. In the 12 years since its implementation, the Basic Pilot Program, now known as E-Verify, has expanded nationwide and is used by over 100,000 employers. Arizona and Mississippi have made use of E-Verify mandatory. In the 111th Congress Calvert again introduced legislation to make use of E-Verify mandatory.

CALFED
As Chairman of the Resources Subcommittee on Water and Power, Calvert introduced H.R. 2828, The Water Supply, Reliability, and Environmental Improvement Act, which reauthorizes the CALFED Bay-Delta program. The CALFED Bay-Delta Program is a unique collaboration among 25 state and federal agencies that came together with a mission to improve California's water supply and the ecological health of the San Francisco Bay/Sacramento-San Joaquin River Delta. H.R. 2828 provides a long-term federal authorization for the western region for water supply and reliability. The bill became Public Law 108-361

The NASA Reauthorization Act of 2005
In the 109th Congress, Calvert chaired the Space and Aeronautics Subcommittee, which oversees NASA. As chair, he introduced and passed into law the NASA Authorization Act of 2005 (P.L. 109-155), the first reauthorization bill of civilian space and aeronautics agency in five years. The reauthorization provided NASA with the direction and tools to implement President George W. Bush's vision for space exploration while stressing the importance of NASA's earth and space science and aeronautics work.

Committee assignments
 Committee on Appropriations
 Subcommittee on Defense (Ranking Member)
 Subcommittee on Interior, Environment, and Related Agencies 
 Subcommittee on the Legislative Branch
 Committee on the Budget

Caucus memberships
House Baltic Caucus
Congressional Western Caucus
United States Congressional International Conservation Caucus

Political positions

Abortion
Calvert has a 24% rating from NARAL Pro-Choice America and an A+ rating from Susan B. Anthony Pro-Life America for his abortion-related voting record. Of the overturning of Roe v. Wade, Calvert said it "shifts the power to set abortion policies to Congress and to the States".

LGBT rights
Calvert voted for the Defense of Marriage Act on July 12, 1996, and for the Federal Marriage Amendment on September 30, 2004, and July 18, 2006. He voted against the Matthew Shepard and James Byrd Jr. Hate Crimes Prevention Act (in form of the Local Law Enforcement Hate Crimes Prevention Act of 2009) on April 29, 2009, and against the Don't Ask, Don't Tell Repeal Act of 2010 on December 15, 2010.

On July 19, 2022, Calvert and 46 other Republican U.S. representatives voted for the Respect for Marriage Act, which would codify the right to same-sex marriage in federal law.

Personal life 
In 1993, two Corona, California, police officers found Calvert with a prostitute in his car. He told the police that he and the woman were "just talking". The Press-Enterprise later went to court to force the Corona police to release the police report. After the report was released, Calvert admitted to having sex with the woman in his car; the police did not have enough evidence to arrest him, as there was no witness to any exchange of money.

See also
List of federal political sex scandals in the United States

References

External links

 Congressman Ken Calvert official U.S. House website
 Ken Calvert for Congress
 
 
 

|-

|-

|-

|-

1953 births
21st-century American politicians
American Congregationalists
American Episcopalians
American real estate businesspeople
Episcopalians from California
Living people
Politicians from Corona, California
Republican Party members of the United States House of Representatives from California
San Diego State University alumni
American gun rights activists
Protestants from California
1990s scandals